Joe Machnik (born January 13, 1943) is an American soccer player, coach, referee, and broadcaster. He is highly regarded for his contributions to the sport in the USA. On August 3, 2017, he was elected to the National Soccer Hall of Fame on the builder ballot.

Player 
Machnik was a soccer player at the Brooklyn Campus of Long Island University. In 1962, he was honored as an All-American goalkeeper.

He was a member of the New York Ukrainians, winner of the 1965 U.S. Open Cup.

Coach/administrator 
Machnik has held the following positions:

 Head coach of 1966 LIU team that reached the National Collegiate Athletic Association (NCAA) championship game
 Coach of the men's and women's soccer team at University of New Haven; also coached the hockey team
 Assistant coach for the U.S. National Team that reached the 1990 World Cup in Italy
 Coach of the New York Arrows of the Major Indoor Soccer League
 Commissioner of the American Indoor Soccer Association

No. 1 Soccer Camps 
Machnik started the No. 1 Goal Keeper's Camp in 1977. The camp was later expanded to include field players, and renamed to No. 1 Soccer Camps. The camps have trained over 80,000 players ,including Nick Rimando, Brad Friedel, Tony Meola, David Vanole, Briana Scurry, and Herculez Gomez. Scurry and Machnik were elected to the National Soccer Hall of Fame as part of the 2017 soccer class.

Referee 
Machnik's soccer refereeing accomplishments include the following:

 Director of Refereeing of MISL
 Director of Refereeing of Major League Soccer
 Director of Refereeing of National Premier Soccer League
 Member of team to run the 2017 Gold Cup Referee Candidate Course in Dallas
 Match commissioner for both CONCACAF and FIFA including overseeing World Cup qualifiers and CONCACAF Champions League games

Broadcaster 
Machnik is the current rules and match commentator for soccer games broadcast by Fox Sports. He started in this role during the 2013 CONCACAF Gold Cup. He has been a commentator for many games including Gold Cups, Women's World Cup, MLS, U.S. National Team, UEFA Champions League, Copa America, the 2018 FIFA World Cup and the Confederations Cup.

Author 
 So You Want to Be a Goal Keeper
 So Now You are a Goalkeeper

Personal life 
Machnik has a Ph.D. from the University of Utah in Recreation/Leisure Studies.

References 

1943 births
Living people
Long Island University alumni
New Haven Chargers men's soccer coaches
New York Arrows
University of Utah alumni
LIU Sharks men's soccer players
LIU Sharks men's soccer coaches
National Soccer Hall of Fame members
Association football goalkeepers
American soccer coaches
New Haven Chargers women's soccer coaches
College men's ice hockey coaches in the United States
Major Indoor Soccer League (1978–1992) coaches
American Indoor Soccer Association
Association football players not categorized by nationality